Turbulence 2: Fear of Flying is a 1999 American direct-to-video disaster thriller film directed by David MacKay and starring Craig Sheffer, Jennifer Beals and Tom Berenger. It is a sequel to the 1997 film Turbulence.

Plot

A group of people celebrate overcoming their fear of flying by taking a flight together. They board a TransContinental Airlines Boeing 747-200, TransCon Flight 110, circling around Seattle–Tacoma International Airport. While the aircraft is cruising, a Czech terrorist hijacks the flight. He says that there is a chemical weapon filled with toxins in the cargo bay and shows the detonator. The Czech hijacker goes to the cockpit and explains the plot to the captain and demands that he land at Seattle or a nearby airport. The captain says he can't land at Seattle due to bad weather and asks the hijacker to wait until the weather improves or use the bomb now. After getting into a scuffle, a British passenger Elliot—claiming to be an MI6 agent—and an FBI officer tie the Czech terrorist down. An aerospace engineer, Martin Messerman, notices that Elliot had placed the detonator in his pocket. When asked to hand it over, he kills the Czech man and the FBI agent. Elliot says to the captain that he's in charge now. After knocking the captain unconscious, he takes control of the plane and the passengers hostage. Martin attempts to warn about the hijack from an airphone but Elliot turns them all off, along with incapacitating Elliot's assistant.

Martin, with the help of another passenger Jessica, goes down to the cargo bay and notifies a fellow Seattle air traffic controller Robert Sikes of the hijack via a VOR system which Elliot doesn't notice initially. He is notified that the aircraft will be shot down if it flies over a populated area and must drop the toxin over water within seven minutes. He is told that the toxin is in cargo box A45114 but only hears "A45..." before Elliot switches off the VOR. Martin deploys the spoilers to slow the 747 to make it descend to 10,000 ft (3,000 m) to open the cargo door without causing decompression and to get a signal for his cellphone. After reaching his intended altitude and acquiring a signal, he retracts the spoilers and opens the cargo door. He finds the toxin in cargo box A45114. Elliot comes down and tries to shoot at the duo, expending all of his ammunition in the process. The ground controllers order the aircraft shot down by a missile from the USS Bremerton. Elliot activates the detonator to blow up the toxin but Martin and Jessica manage to drop the toxin out the plane before it detonates over water. They notify Seattle that the toxin has been dropped and the missile from the Bremerton is redirected and aborted.

Elliot takes one of the passengers, Wilcox, into the cockpit to accompany him and finds Martin and Jessica hiding in the crew compartment. He is about to shoot Martin but Martin says that he is an aerospace engineer and can land the plane. Martin grabs the control but is ordered by Elliot not to try anything or else he will kill Jessica. Martin broadcasts Elliot's demands: no police, no armed personnel, await further instructions. Martin is forced to make a flyby over Sea-Tac Airport, but objects due to fuel levels. Elliot throws Wilcox out of the plane and ties Jessica to one of the seats using the handcuffs that were used to tie up the Czech terrorist. He lands in the airport control tower and is gravely injured, leaving this as a warning if Elliot's demands are ignored. Martin manages to land the plane with two engines. SWAT teams surround the aircraft. Elliot, accompanied by Martin, staggers down the airstair and retorts that he is "already halfway home". Martin uses his cellphone to record his conversation to the air traffic controllers and federal agents in the control tower, who hear this via speaker. Martin's son Trevor is seen in terminal with one of Elliot's henchmen wielding a gun. As Martin and Elliot enter an ambulance, Trevor runs out on the tarmac which Elliot's henchman pursuing and being killed by SWAT units. A fight ensues when Elliot shoots and injures a paramedic but is killed with his wrist-equipped spike when Martin breaks it and stabs Elliot with it, killing him instantly. Martin reunites with Trevor and Jessica. He meets Robert Sikes in person and the three go home while the passengers disembark.

Cast
 Craig Sheffer as Martin Messerman
 Jennifer Beals as Jessica
 Tom Berenger as Robert Sikes
 Jeffrey Nordling as Elliot
 Jay Brazeau as Harold
 Andrew Kavadas as Russ Bell
 Peter Wilds as Stanley Niles
 Avery Raskin as Bradford Wilcox
 Peter Kelamis as Mazzo
 Tim Henry as Dickson
 Howard Siegel as Blake
 Dillon Moen as Trevor
 Douglas Newell as Kessler
 Andrew McIlroy as Brewster
 Scott Owen as Lenny
 Tom Shorthouse as Ralph
 Jill Teed as Kit
 Jody Thompson as Stacey
 Katrina Matthews as Michelle
 Tamara Phillips as Hobbs
 Chilton Crane as Hazel
 Claire Riley as Peggy
 Donna Peerless as Mildred
 D. Neil Mark as Naval Officer
 Dean McKenzie as SWAT Team Leader
 Hiro Kanagawa as Controller 
 Paul Jarrett as Vaclav
 Zinaid Memisevic as Jan
 Mike Dopud as Petr
 Vitaly Kravchenko as Josef
 Adrian Formosa as Henchman
 Daryl Shuttleworth as Captain Reynolds
 Simon Longmore as Co-Pilot
 Robin Avery as Navigator

Reception
On review aggregator website Rotten Tomatoes, Turbulence 2: Fear of Flying holds an approval rating of 14% based on seven reviews, with an average rating of 2.7/10.

References

External links
 
 

1999 films
1999 crime thriller films
1990s disaster films
1999 direct-to-video films
American aviation films
American crime thriller films
American disaster films
Direct-to-video action films
Direct-to-video sequel films
Films scored by Don Davis (composer)
Films about aviation accidents or incidents
Films about aircraft hijackings
Films set in Washington (state)
Films set on airplanes
Trimark Pictures films
Films about terrorism
1990s English-language films
1990s American films